More Than You Know is the second album by American urban gospel group Out of Eden, released in 1996 on Gotee Records.

Track listing 
 "More Than You Know" (Lisa Bragg, Michael Bragg, Todd Collins) - 4:09
 "Greater Love" (Lisa Bragg, Michael Bragg) - 3:46
 "It's Me" (Butch Dillon, Lisa Bragg, Micah Wilshire, Michael Bragg) - 4:25
 "Good Time" (Lisa Bragg, Michael Bragg, Todd Collins) - 3:59
 "You Brought The Sunshine" (Twinkie Clark) - 5:20
 "Get It Right" (featuring Knowdaverbs) (Lisa Bragg, Michael Bragg) - 4:21
 "Giving My All" (Lisa Bragg, Michael Bragg) - 3:54
 "Confused" (Lisa Bragg, Michael Bragg) - 5:00
 "Get To Heaven" (D. Paich, Lisa Bragg, Michael Bragg, Todd Collins) - 4:00
 "Can't Let Go" (Lisa Bragg, Michael Bragg) - 3:31
 "Then And Only Then" (Hall Delise, Lisa Bragg) - 20:10

Personnel 
Out of Eden
 Andrea Kimmey-Baca – vocals
 Danielle Kimmey – vocals 
 Lisa Kimmey-Bragg – vocals, arrangements, producer, vocal producer

Musicians and Production
 Michael Bragg – keyboards, programming, percussion, string arrangements, producer 
 Todd Collins – keyboards, programming, drums, engineer 
 Jeff Roach – acoustic piano 
 Tom Wanca – keyboards, engineer 
 Micah Wilshire – guitars 
 Otto Price – bass 
 Todd Robbins – engineer 
 Joe Baldridge – mixing 
 Joe Costa – mixing 
 Erik Wolf – mastering 
 Kerri McKeehan-Stuart – artwork
 Diana Barnes – artwork
 Matthew Barnes – photography 

1996 albums
Out of Eden albums
Gotee Records albums